Ruben Gonzales and Ruan Roelofse were the defending champions but chose to defend their title with different partners. Gonzales partnered Hunter Johnson but lost in the first round to Hans Hach Verdugo and Miguel Ángel Reyes-Varela. Roelofse partnered Christopher Rungkat but lost in the quarterfinals to William Blumberg and Max Schnur.

Blumberg and Schnur won the title after defeating Jason Jung and Evan King 7–5, 6–7(5–7), [10–5] in the final.

Seeds

Draw

References

External links
 Main draw

Las Vegas Challenger - Doubles
2021 Doubles